In the Story Book is a Canadian children's television series which aired on CBC Television from 1956 to 1957.

Premise
Classic stories were presented with pantomime and dance routines in this series geared for children up to age eight. Works covered include those by Hans Christian Andersen, J. M. Barrie, Lewis Carroll, and the Brothers Grimm.

Production
This series was produced at CBC Montreal by Roger Racine, with stories adapted by Ann Fafoutakis. Heino Heiden was the program choreographer.

Scheduling
This 15-minute series was broadcast on Mondays at 5:00 p.m. (Eastern) from 12 November 1956 to 24 June 1957.

References

External links
 

CBC Television original programming
1950s Canadian children's television series
1956 Canadian television series debuts
1957 Canadian television series endings
Black-and-white Canadian television shows